Hudák or Hudak is Slovak surname, which is a variant of the name chudák, meaning "Poor Man". The name may refer to:
 
Dávid Hudák (born 1993), Slovak football player
Erin Rachel Hudak (born 1978), American artist 
Evie Hudak (born 1951), American politician
Harald Hudak (born 1957), German athlete
Jen Hudak (born 1986), American skier
Ľuboš Hudák (born 1968), Slovak handball player 
Mike Hudak (born 1952), American environmentalist
Paul Hudak (1952–2015), American computer scientist
Pavol Hudák (1959–2011), Slovak writer
Tim Hudak (born 1967), Canadian politician

See also
Hudak Peak, Antarctica

References

Slovak-language surnames